Papagayo is a free Lip-syncing software made in Python for Microsoft Windows, Mac OS X and Linux. It works by importing an audio file, as well as writing the text for the audio and placing it accordingly. The program then uses a built-in dictionary to select the appropriate mouth for the spoken text. Modifications and dictionaries are available on the forum.

Originally created as a tool for LostMarble's own Moho editor, the tool is being adopted by users and developers of several open source animation products (including Blender and Synfig Studio) to add lip-sync features not available in the base software package.

References 

Audio to video synchronization